Schlegel is a German surname.

Schlegel may also refer to:

Places
Schlegel, Saxony, a village in the district of Löbau-Zittau in Saxony belonging to the town of Zittau
Schlegel, Thuringia, a municipality in the district of Saale-Orla-Kreis in Thuringia

Other uses
12659 Schlegel, a main-belt asteroid
Schlegel International, a multi-national company that makes seals for windows and doors in buildings and automobiles
a drum stick (German)

See also
Christian Schlegel Farm, a historic farm in Pennsylvania
George Schlegel, a New York printing company
Schlegel diagram, a geometric projection described in 1886 by Victor Schlegel